Sing a Happy Song: The Warner Bros. Recordings is an album by American blues artist Taj Mahal.

Track listing
Disc 1
 "You Got It"
 "Freight Train"
 "Baby, You're My Destiny"
 "Sailin' Into Walker's Cay"
 "Truck Driver's Two-Step"
 "The Four Mills Brothers"
 "Honey Babe"
 "Curry"
 "Ain't Gwine Whistle Dixie (Any Mo')"
 "Freight Train"
 "Going Up to the Country, Paint My Mailbox Blue"
 "Blackjack Davy"
 "Truck Driver's Two-Step"
 "Ain't Nobody's Business But My Own"
 "Johnny Too Bad"

Disc 2
 "Love Theme in the Key of D"
 "Funky Butt"
 "Brother's Doin' Time"
 "Night Rider"
 "Free the Brothers"
 "Sentidos Dulce (Sweet Feelings)"
 "The Funeral March"
 "Malcolm's Song"
 "David and Angela"
 "Sing a Happy Song"
 "Queen Bee"
 "Lowdown Showdown"
 "The Most Recent (Evolution) of Muthafusticus Modernusticus"
 "Why You Do Me This Way"
 "Salsa De Laventille"
 "The Big Blues"
 "Highnite"
 "Southbound with the Hammer Down"

References

2001 compilation albums
Taj Mahal (musician) compilation albums